Nordstromia sumatrana is a moth in the family Drepanidae. It was described by Walter Karl Johann Roepke in 1948. It is found on Sumatra.

References

Moths described in 1948
Drepaninae